Atlıxan is a village and municipality in the Qusar Rayon of Azerbaijan. It has a population of 664.

References

Populated places in Qusar District